John Gordon Stewart Drysdale (21 May 1925 – 10 July 2016), also known as Abbas Idriss, was a British-born army officer, diplomat, writer, historian, and businessman. Drysdale spent much of his life in Somalia, Somaliland and Singapore. He would serve as an advisor to three successive Somali prime ministers in the 1960s and later for three successive United Nations special envoys during the international intervention in the Somali Civil War. 

He has also authored several books and founded numerous important academic journals and publications.

Early Life 
Drysdale served in the British Army during World War II and later became an army officer. He first introduced to Somalis when he was deployed to the then-protectorate of British Somaliland in 1943. As a teenage member of the British Army he served in the First Somali Battalion during the Burma Campaign against the Japanese. After the war he joined the British Colonial Service and its successor, the Foreign Service, which allowed him to return to postings in Africa. He served in the Gold Coast (present-day Ghana) and the former Italian Somaliland, which was administered by the British after World War II.

Somalia became an independent country in 1960, following the union of the former British Somaliland and the Trust Territory of Somaliland. John Drysdale served as an advisor to three Prime Ministers of Somalia following independence. Drysdale, who spoke fluent Somali, was widely regarded as an expert on Somali culture, history, literature and society. He authored several books on Somalia, including The Somali Dispute in 1964 and a landmark reference book focusing on Somali people and politics, Whatever Happened to Somalia, which was published in 1994.

Drysdale, who was also a businessman and publisher, wrote extensively on the politics and history of Africa and Southeast Asia. He founded the Africa Research Bulletin, based in the United Kingdom in 1964, as well as the Asia Research Bulletin, which was published in Singapore in a partnership with the Straits Times Group. His book, Singapore Struggle for Success, a history of modern Singaporean society, is still studied by the country's students.

United Nations Intervention in Somalia (1992 - 1993) 
During the UN intervention in Somalia in 1992 and 1993, Drysdale was hired by UNOSOM II for his expertise on Somalia and was assigned to three successive UNOSOM II special envoys. 

He would be a vocal supporter of political reconciliation with General Mohammed Farah Aidid instead of the UNOSOM manhunt that would follow the June 5, 1993, attack on the Pakistanis. He resigned as an adviser on September 30, 1993, distressed by the United Nations emphasis on military operations against the Somali National Alliance and mounting collateral damage being inflicted by UNOSOM on Somali civilians. A few days later, following the disastrous Battle of Mogadishu, President Bill Clinton would relent on the American lead hunt for Aidid and begin to closely follow the diplomatic resolution that had been initially proposed by Drysdale months earlier.

Later Life 
In 1994 John Drysdale moved to Somaliland, working in part as an advisor to then-President Muhammad Haji Ibrahim Egal. He established a land survey NGO, called Cadastral Surveys, which mapped and established farm boundaries in Gabiley and Dilla in the country's west.

In 2002, he would become a member of the first Board of Trustees of Edna Adan Hospital in Hargeisa. In 2009, Drysdale would convert to Islam at ceremony held in Hargeisa’s main Mosque and changed his name completely to Abbas Idris and became an official Somaliland citizen shortly after. Notably, he would become the first Caucasian to vote in Somaliland elections after he acquired dual citizenship. 

He would later marry and spend the last years of his life living in Gabiley, Somaliland.

Death 
Drysdale would die on 10 July 2016 following a short illness. 

A state funeral was held at the Maslah Muslim burial grounds in Hargeisa on 12 July 2016. Dignitaries in attendance at his funeral included President of the Republic of Somaliland, Ahmed Mohamed Mohamoud, members of the British representative office in Somaliland – and the high emissary of the British Embassy in Ethiopia.

References

1925 births
2016 deaths
Members of HM Diplomatic Service
British historians
British publishers (people)
British Army personnel of World War II
British emigrants to Somaliland
British expatriates in Somaliland
British expatriates in Somalia
British expatriates in Singapore
Colonial Service officers